Tassin or Eustache de la Fosse (also spelled Delafosse) (ca. 1451 - 23 April 1523) was a Flemish-speaking sailor and merchant from Tournai, who traveled with Portuguese sailors from Palos to territories of West Africa (1479–80)  in what are now Guinea-Bissau, some 12°  north latitude. He left a manuscript on his travel dated 1548 at the Valenciennes Library.

1450s births
1523 deaths
Burgundian Netherlands writers
15th-century explorers
People of the Burgundian Netherlands
People from Tournai
15th-century explorers of Africa